No Resemblance Whatsoever is a collaboration album by American singer-songwriter Dan Fogelberg and jazz flutist Tim Weisberg, released in 1995. The cover art was a current picture of the two in a pose similar to that on the cover of their 1978 collaboration Twin Sons of Different Mothers. The album title was a comedic reference to the pair who once looked somewhat like brothers (per the album title of their last collaboration), but now not so much with their clean-shaven faces and the passage of 17 years. This particular album, according to Fogelberg, only took 10 days to record. Weisberg sued Fogelberg in 1997 claiming fraud and breach of contract over money Weisberg claimed was owed to him from the album sales and the subsequent tour.

Track listing

Personnel 
 Dan Fogelberg – lead vocals, backing vocals, grand piano, keyboards, acoustic guitar, electric lead guitar, classical guitar, strings (3, 9), bass (5)
 Tim Weisberg – flute, alto flute, bass flute, piccolo
 Larry Cohn – keyboards, horn arrangements (2), acoustic piano (3, 6), string arrangements (3, 9)
 Michael Landau – electric guitars
 Neil Stubenhaus – bass (1-4, 6-10)
 Vinnie Colaiuta – drums
 Alex Acuña – percussion
 Pete Christlieb – saxophones (2)
 Joel Peskin – saxophones (2)
 Tom Scott – saxophones (2)
 Dick Hyde – trombone (2), trumpet (2)
 Gary Grant – trumpet (2)
 Julia Tillman Waters – backing vocals (6)
 Maxine Willard Waters – backing vocals (6)
 Oren Waters – backing vocals (6)

Production 
 Dan Fogelberg – producer 
 Tim Weisberg – producer 
 Elliot Scheiner – basic track recording 
 David Glover – recording (vocals, keyboards, guitars)
 Marty Lewis – recording (all flutes)
 Mike Baumgartner – assistant engineer
 Mike Kloster – assistant engineer 
 David Knight – assistant engineer
 Mike Nally – assistant engineer
 John Paterno – assistant engineer
 Mike Piersante – assistant engineer
 Don Murray – mixing 
 Wally Traugott – mastering at Tower Mastering (Hollywood, California)
 John Kosh – art direction, design 
 Henry Diltz – band photography 
 Reisig & Taylor – cover photography 
 Susie Chinn – llama photography 
 HK Management – management for Dan Fogelberg 
 JL Management – management for Tim Weisberg

References

Dan Fogelberg albums
1995 albums
Collaborative albums
Giant Records (Warner) albums